Conservation and Society is a quarterly, open-access, peer-reviewed, academic journal covering political ecology, human–wildlife conflicts, decentralised conservation, conservation policy, ecosystem structure and functioning, systematics, community and species ecology, behavioural ecology, landscape ecology, restoration ecology, and conservation biology. The editor-in-chief is Kamaljit Bawa (University of Massachusetts Amherst). The journal was established in 2003 and published biannually until 2005. Conservation and Society is published by Medknow Publications on behalf of the Ashoka Trust for Research in Ecology and the Environment, headquartered in Bangalore, India.

Abstracting and indexing 
Conservation and Society is abstracted and indexed in:
 Aquatic Sciences and Fisheries Abstracts
 EBSCO Publishing's Electronic Databases
 Ecology Abstracts
 Human Population and the Environment Abstracts
 ProQuest
 Scopus

References

External links 
 
 Ashoka Trust for Research in Ecology and the Environment, India

Open access journals
English-language journals
Medknow Publications academic journals
Publications established in 2003
Quarterly journals
Environmental social science journals
Ecology journals
Political ecology